Vanessa is a Mexican telenovela produced by Valentín Pimstein for Televisa in 1982. Is a remake of the successful Brazilian telenovela Idolo de Pano.

It starred by Lucía Méndez, Héctor Bonilla, Rogelio Guerra, Angélica Aragón and Nuria Bages.

Plot 
Vanessa is a young girl who lives with her father José de Jesús and his brother Juan. Both work at the railway, and have a small house near the tracks. In order to help them, Vanessa gets a job in the textile factory of Cecile Saint Michel, run by a powerful and successful woman who lives in a huge mansion with her grandchildren Pierre and Luciano.

Cast 
 
Lucía Méndez as Vanessa
Héctor Bonilla as Luciano
Rogelio Guerra as Pierre
Angélica Aragón as Luisa
Nuria Bages as Jane
Antonio Brillas as José de Jesus
Aurora Clavell as Rosa
Isabela Corona as Dona Cecile de St. Michel
Carlos Cámara as Dr. Servin
Alma Delfina as Lolita
Pedro Juan Figueroa as Wagner
Virginia Gutiérrez as Magda
Fernando Larranga as Dr.Fuentes
Antonio Medellín as Guillermo
Flor Procuna as Martha
Adriana Roel as Amelia
Abraham Stavans as Nicolás
Sylvia Suárez as Armida
Alejandro Camacho as Juan
Rosalía Valdéz as Irma
Maricarmen Martínez as Cristina
Ana Silvia Garza as Elsa
Patricia Ancira as Ana
Roxana Saucedo as Flavia
Mirrah Saavedra as Rita
Mariana Gaja as Vanessa's daughter
Miguel Cane as Pierre (age 7)
Christopher Lago as Luciano (age 7)
Emilio Gaete as Mauricio Subercaseaux

Awards

References

External links 

Mexican telenovelas
1982 telenovelas
Televisa telenovelas
1982 Mexican television series debuts
1982 Mexican television series endings
Mexican television series based on Brazilian television series
Spanish-language telenovelas